The Museum of Diving (Muzeum Nurkowania), located at 88 Grzybowska Street in Warsaw, was established in 2006 by the Warsaw Diving Club (Warszawski Klub Płetwonurków).

The museum was opened on 27 February 2006 marking the 50th anniversary of the establishment of the Warsaw Diving Club. It is the only such institution in Poland and one of the few in Europe.

It has a collection of around 800 objects associated with underwater diving and underwater archaeology. Its oldest exhibit is a diving helmet made in 1895.

The museum holds monthly ‘Wednesday Movies’ nights, during which films about diving are shown.

References

Bibliography

External links 
 Official website

Museums in Warsaw
Museum of Diving
Museums established in 2006
Museum of Diving